Mike Maynard (born c. 1956) is a former American football coach. He served as the head football coach at the University of Redlands in Redlands, California from 1988 until his retirement in the spring of 2021, compiling a record of 206–91–1. Maynard was previously a football coach for the Claremont-Mudd-Scripps joint athletic program.

Head coaching record

Awards
In 1990, he was awarded the American Football Coaches’ Association West Region Coach of the Year. In 2005, he became a University of Redlands Bulldog Bench Intercollegiate Athletics Hall of Famer, and in 2007 received the All-American Football Foundation Johnny Vaught Head Coach Award.

See also
 List of college football coaches with 200 wins

Notes

References

Year of birth missing (living people)
1950s births
Living people
Claremont-Mudd-Scripps Stags football coaches
Redlands Bulldogs football coaches